ONE Friday Fights 11 (also known as ONE Lumpinee 11) is an upcoming combat sports event produced by ONE Championship that will take place on March 31, 2023, at Lumpinee Boxing Stadium in Bangkok, Thailand.

Fight card

See also 

 2023 in ONE Championship
 List of ONE Championship events
 List of current ONE fighters

References 

Events in Bangkok
ONE Championship events
2023 in mixed martial arts
Mixed martial arts in Thailand
Sports competitions in Thailand
March 2023 sports events in Thailand
Scheduled mixed martial arts events